Ashem Vohu (Avestan: 𐬀𐬴𐬆𐬨 𐬬𐬊𐬵𐬏 aṣ̌əm vohū) is a very important prayer in Zoroastrianism. The Ashem Vohu, after the Ahunavar is considered one of the most basic, yet meaningful and powerful mantras in the religion. It is considered a lesson and praise of those who embrace Asha, along with being a sacred blessing for the aforementioned. It is also at the end of most of the prayers in the Khordeh Avesta, except a certain few, most notably the Fravarane.

Ashem vohu, Ahunavar, Yenghe hatam, and Airyaman ishya form four pillars of the Gathic canon, part of the group of Zoroastrian texts composed in the archaic dialect of the Avestan language.

Prayer

There are many translations that all differ significantly due to the complexity of Avestan and the concepts involved. For example:

or:

or:

or:

or:

There is also a Sogdian version of the prayer: 
.

See also
 Zoroastrian prayer

References

The main point to be noted in the translation is that the word "Holiness", can also be replaced with Righteousness and its main origin term "Asha".

Bibliography

 
Zoroastrian prayer